Real Hasta la Muerte (RHLM) is a Puerto Rican record label founded by rapper Anuel AA in 2017, it has one headquarters located in Puerto Rico and two in Florida. His music is distributed by The Orchard.

The label's current acts include Anuel AA and Kendo Kaponi. The label has had four projects: Real Hasta la Muerte, Emmanuel, Los Dioses, Las Leyendas Nunca Mueren and LLNM2.

History

2017–2019 

Real Hasta la Muerte was founded in 2017 by Anuel AA, a year before releasing his debut album Real Hasta la Muerte, this happened while he was in prison.

Anuel's Real Hasta la Muerte (2018) was the label's first album release, leading both the artist and label to tremendous success, debuting at number fifty-one on the Billboard 200.

On April 24, 2019, Anuel signs a contract with The Orchard for them to distribute the music of all the members of Real Hasta la Muerte.

2020–present 
In 2020 Kendo Kaponi is released from prison, signs for the label and releases his song "Resistencia". In May 2020, Anuel releases his second studio album, Emmanuel, debuting at number eight on the Billboard 200. On November 19, 2020, Anuel released his song "Me Contagié 2" on his Instagram account, announcing his retirement from music, but in January 2021 he returned to music, releasing his third studio album Los Dioses with Ozuna, debuting at number ten on the Billboard 200. In November 2021, Anuel releases his four studio album, Las Leyendas Nunca Mueren, debuting at number thirty on the Billboard 200.

On August 20, 2022, Frabián Elí was removed from his position as president of the label and files a lawsuit against Anuel AA for breach of contract. On August 22, 2022, José Gazmey becomes the new president of the label.

In December 2022, Anuel releases his fifth studio album LLNM2, debuting at number thirty on the Billboard 200.

Artists

Current acts

Presidents

Discography 
Real Hasta la Muerte has officially released fifth studio albums.

Studio albums

References 

American record labels
Hip hop record labels
Puerto Rican record labels
Record labels established in 2017
Reggaeton record labels